The PollyGrind Film Festival, also known as simply Pollygrind and the PollyGrind Underground Film Festival, was an annual event held in Las Vegas, Nevada that specialized "in all things alternative, with a wide variety of films not shown elsewhere." Spotlighting short films, feature-length films, music videos and trailers of all genres, PollyGrind was founded by filmmaker and promoter Chad Clinton Freeman. The event prided itself on focusing on individuality, diversity, creativity and empowerment. Vegas Seven has said PollyGrind is a "celebration of all things, dark, bloody, underground and arthouse."

History 
The event gave a slew of awards that are quite different than most festivals. Those include The Biggest Baddest Mother of the PollyGrind, Best Use of Nudity/Sexuality, Best Use of Violence/Gore, Most Outrageous, and Most Creative. There is also a Bad Girl Award and an Ultimate Badass Award.

Started in 2010, PollyGrind's first year was a five-night event "with over a dozen features, plus tons of short films, trailers and music videos; the quality ranged from borderline incompetent to undiscovered genius, virtually all within the confines of horror and sci-fi." Arrowinthehead.com declared the event a "B-movie jamboree of awesomeness" that "only Vegas has the balls to host."

The second installment of the festival included more than 100 films over a span of 10 days. Programming ranged from campy horror B-movies to extreme, underground and avant-garde films  and according to Robin Leach featured "every night creature from hookers to zombies."

DreadCentral.com noted that "PollyGrind has quickly made a name for itself as one of the up-and-coming premiere genre fests out there due to the success of each year of programming." Filmmaker Adam Rehmeier, whose film The Bunny Game was banned by the British Board of Film Classification right after playing the event, called the festival a display of cinema's "bastards and red-headed step children."

MovieMaker magazine named PollyGrind to its 2014 list of "50 festivals worth the entry fee" and its 2012 list of "25 festivals worth the entry fee." The festival was also named to MovieMaker's 2013 "Top 5 Coolest Experiemntal/Underground Film Festivals."

As of 2013, PollyGrind is a member of Film Exchange, a multi-market screening network composed of regional U.S. and International film festivals. Select winners at PollyGrind advance to screen at the RxSM Self-Medicated Film Expo (RxSM), which takes place in Austin, Texas each year alongside South by Southwest.

Starting in 2014, feature film official selections at the festival will also be looked at for distribution through its new label PollyGrind Presents, while short films will be considered for special features and compilation releases through a number of outlets.

In regards to successes of the festival, filmmaker Eric Stanze noted in his 2014 Fearnet column that Jen Soska and Sylvia Soska of American Mary fame and Calvin Reeder of The Rambler and V/H/S received "major boosts in their careers when their early works won key awards at the fest." He also noted "Randy Moore’s 2013 Sundance Official Selection Escape from Tomorrow was first an Official Selection of PollyGrind in 2012."

2014 marked the final year of the festival. While it may be resurrected in the future, as of summer 2015, it was no longer in operation.

Award winners

World premieres

2014
Rebel Scum
Teddy Bomb
The Interrogation of Cheryl Cooper
Spirits
Heidi
Black Mask
World of Death: PollyGrind Edition
The Beauty Strip

2013
Jonas
To Jennifer
13/13/13
Slaughterhouse Bride
House of Forbidden Secrets
Buried In Flesh
Desolate
Darkest Days
American Girls
Faceless - Best Screenplay : Jack "Saint" Hunter
Sweet Leaf
Diet of Sex
The Minstrel Killer
The Synthetic Man
The Yellow Bellies
Sacrifice: In the Name of Goddess Gadhimai
Tricks
Eye of the Bennu
Legend of the Hillbilly Butcher
Bruised
The Window
Marty's House

2012
After the Dawn
Trash and Progress
My Name Is 'A' by Anonymous
Zero in the System
When Time Becomes a Woman
Planet Megadolce
Blood for Irina
Day Job
The Smell of Love
Play Hooky
Fat Cat
Bulletface
Video Diary of a Lost Girl
 "A Monster Among Men"
Sunday's Child
REW

2011
Mondo Sexxxx: The Terry Kobrah Story
The Las Vegas Abductions
The Gruesome Death of Tommy Pistol
The Girl Who Wasn't Missing
Finger Bang
The Los Angeles Ripper
The Atonement of Janis Drake
The Earl Sessions

2010
Vaginal Holocaust
Caged Lesbos A-Go-Go
Orgy of Blood
The Dead Undead
Scars of Youth

References

External links

Film festivals in Nevada
Culture of the Las Vegas Valley
Underground film festivals
Experimental film festivals
Film festivals established in 2010
2010 establishments in Nevada
Festivals disestablished in 2014
2014 disestablishments in Nevada
Defunct film festivals in the United States